is a railway station in the city of Takasaki, Gunma, Japan, operated by the East Japan Railway Company (JR East), with a freight depot operated by the Japan Freight Railway Company (JR Freight).

Lines
Trains of the Shōnan–Shinjuku Line also stop at this station using the same tracks and platforms as the Takasaki Line.

Station layout
The station consists of two island platforms connected to the station building by a footbridge. The station has a Midori no Madoguchi ticket office.

Platforms

History
The station opened on 1 May 1894. Upon the privatization of the Japanese National Railways (JNR) on 1 April 1987, it came under the control of JR East.

Passenger statistics
In fiscal 2019, the station was used by an average of 1861 passengers daily (boarding passengers only).

Surrounding area
 
 Sengenyama Kofun, National Historic Site
 Kuragano Freight Terminal
 Kuragano Post Office

See also
 List of railway stations in Japan

References

External links

 Station information (JR East) 

Takasaki Line
Hachikō Line
Stations of Japan Freight Railway Company
Railway stations in Gunma Prefecture
Railway stations in Japan opened in 1894
Stations of East Japan Railway Company
Takasaki, Gunma